Goobuntu was a Linux distribution based on Ubuntu LTS (long-term support). It was used by almost 10,000 Google employees. It added a number of packages for in-house use, including security features and disabled the installation of some applications, but was otherwise similar. Thomas Bushnell, a Google technical leader for the company's Linux desktops, displayed Goobuntu at LinuxCon 2012. Bushnell explained that "Goobuntu is simply a light skin over standard Ubuntu."

Some suggested Google might plan to market the distribution more widely, but Goobuntu was never officially released. While both Google and Mark Shuttleworth, who spearheaded the development of Ubuntu, confirmed the existence of Goobuntu, both denied that Google had any plans to market the operating system.

Mark Shuttleworth confirmed that Google has contributed patches to Ubuntu.

Google used Puppet to manage its installed base of Goobuntu machines.

In 2018, Google replaced Goobuntu with gLinux, a Linux distribution based on Debian Testing.

See also

 Google
 ChromeOS
 List of Linux distributions
 List of Ubuntu-based distributions

References

External links
 A screenshot of the login screen in Goobuntu, snapped at an officewarming party held for Google's newly inaugurated Tel Aviv offices (Yaron Orenstein).

Ubuntu derivatives
Google software
Linux distributions

de:Liste von Linux-Distributionen#Ubuntu-Derivate